GDP Density is a measure of economic activity by area. It is expressed as GDP per square kilometer and can be calculated by multiplying GDP per capita of an area by the population density of that area. Amongst other uses it demonstrates the effects of geography on economy.

References

Density